Anomologa is a genus of moth in the family Gelechiidae.

Species
 Anomologa demens Meyrick, 1926
 Anomologa dispulsa Meyrick, 1926

References

Anomologini
Taxa named by Edward Meyrick
Moth genera